Erico may refer to:

People
Erico Verissimo (1905–1975), Brazilian writer
Arsenio Erico (1915–1977), Paraguayan football striker
Erico Menczer (1926–2012), Italian cinematographer
Erico Spinadel (1929–2020), Austrian-Argentine industrial engineer
Erico Aumentado (1940–2012), Filipino politician
Érico de Souza (born 1947), Brazilian rower
Erico Basilio Fabian (born 1957), Filipino politician
Erico Aristotle Aumentado (born 1977), Filipino businessman and politician
Erico (footballer, born 1989), Brazilian football centre-back
Érico Castro (born 1992), Angolan football attacking midfielder
Érico Sousa (born 1995), Portuguese football midfielder
Erico Cuna (born 2000), Angolan swimmer

Places
Érico Cardoso, municipality in Bahia, Brazil
Ericó River, river in Roraima, Brazil

See also
Eric (disambiguation)
Erica (disambiguation)